Clinton Township, officially the Charter Township of Clinton, is a charter township of Macomb County in the U.S. state of Michigan.  As of the 2020 census, the township had a total population of 100,513. It ranks as Michigan's most-populated township and 8th most-populated municipality overall.  

The township is home to many parks, notably George George Memorial Park. The main branch of the Clinton River, for which the township was named, runs through Clinton Township.

Communities
There are two unincorporated communities in the township/CDP:
Broad Acres is located in the southeastern portion on M-3/Gratiot Avenue between 15 Mile and Quinn Roads (Elevation: 610 ft./186 m.).
Cady is located in the southwestern portion at Utica and Moravian Roads (Elevation: 614 ft./187 m.). It was founded in 1833 by Chauncey G. Cady. Cady served for a time as township supervisor and was also a member of the state legislature. It had a post office from 1864 until 1906.

History
The first settlement on the land currently known as Clinton Township was called Gnadenhuetten and established in 1782 by Rev. David Zeisberg, but closed in 1786. 
The township was organized as "Huron Township" on August 12, 1818, named after what was then known as the Huron River. Because of confusion with another Huron River south of Detroit, on July 17, 1824, the Michigan Territorial Legislature renamed both the township and the river after DeWitt Clinton, the popular governor of New York from 1817 to 1823 who was largely responsible for building the Erie Canal which enabled many settlers to come to Michigan.

Description

Moravian Drive is the township's oldest road dating back to the days when the Moravian Missionaries settled to attempt to convert the local Native Americans.

Residents are served by the Clinton-Macomb Public Library. Clinton Township is also home of the Walker Goldie Institute. This organization is dedicated to the education of youth through teaching and after school programs. The organization was founded by Kimberly Hyde in 2007. It is currently inactive. https://michigan-company.com/co/walker-goldie-inc

Geography

The Clinton River forks into three branches within the township.

Demographics
As of the census of 2010, there were 96,796 people, 42,036 households, and 25,678 families residing in the township. The racial makeup of the township was 82.08% White, 13.04% African American, 0.28% Native American, 1.79% Asian, 0.03% Pacific Islander, 0.61% from other races, and 2.17% from two or more races. Hispanic or Latino people of any race were 2.37% of the population. By 2016, the township's population was estimated to have surpassed 100,000.

In 2000, there were 40,299 households, out of which 28.1% had children under the age of 18 living with them, 48.7% were married couples living together, 10.9% had a female householder with no husband present, and 36.6% were non-families. 30.8% of all households were made up of individuals, and 10.8% had someone living alone who was 65 years of age or older.  The average household size was 2.35 and the average family size was 2.98.

In 2000, 22.4% of the population was under the age of 18, 9.1% from 18 to 24, 30.9% from 25 to 44, 23.4% from 45 to 64, and 14.3% who were 65 years of age or older.  The median age was 37 years. For every 100 females, there were 92.4 males.  For every 100 females age 18 and over, there were 88.5 males. The median income for a household in the township was $50,067, and the median income for a family was $61,497. Males had a median income of $48,818 versus $29,847 for females. The per capita income for the township was $25,758.  About 4.2% of families and 5.8% of the population were below the poverty line, including 7.4% of those under age 18 and 6.8% of those age 65 or over.

Culture
The Italian American Cultural Society (IACS) is located in Clinton Township. The IACS building is located on Romeo Plank Road, north of 19 Mile, situated on the northern edge of the township. It is in proximity to the former ex-Partridge Creek clubhouse. In 2004, the center moved to its current location from Warren.

Education

Chippewa Valley Schools, with two high schools (Chippewa Valley and Dakota), and Clintondale Community Schools, with one high school (Clintondale High), are the primary school districts in the township. Other school districts that operate within Clinton Township are L'Anse Creuse, Fraser, and Mount Clemens.

Media
The Macomb Daily is headquartered in Clinton Township.

Notable people
Eminem resides in Clinton Township, as does three-time Ms. Olympia Andrea Shaw.

References

Notes

Sources

External links

Charter Township of Clinton home page
Macomb County Library
Clinton-Macomb Public Library
Clinton Township Historical Commission home page
Sister cities in Michigan

Townships in Macomb County, Michigan
Charter townships in Michigan
1818 establishments in Michigan Territory
Populated places established in 1818
Former census-designated places in Michigan